Simon Martirosyan (born 17 February 1997) is an Armenian weightlifter, Olympian, two time World Champion, and two time European Champion competing in the 105 kg category until 2018 and 109 kg starting in 2018 after the International Weightlifting Federation reorganized the categories.

Career
He held the youth world record  for the snatch, the clean and jerk and total in the +94 kg division before weight classes were changed in 2018 nullifying earlier records. He is currently the world record holder in the Total for the −109 kg division.

In 2014 Martirosyan competed at the 2014 Summer Youth Olympics winning a gold medal in the +85 kg category.

Olympics
He competed for Armenia in the 2016 Summer Olympics, where he won the silver medal in the men's 105 kg competition.

World Championships
In 2018 the International Weightlifting Federation reorganized the categories nullifying earlier records, and coming into the competition it was suspected to be a close race between Ruslan Nurudinov (gold medalist at the 2016 Summer Olympics), and Yang Zhe (4th place at the 2016 Summer Olympics). After the snatch portion of the competition, Ruslan Nurudinov was out of the running for a total (as he did not complete a lift), and Yang Zhe was leading Martirosyan by 1 kg. In the clean & jerk portion of the competition, Martirosyan was the last lifter to begin lifting, and with his first lift of 230 kg he was in first place. After Nurudinov was unable to complete his next lift of 238 kg, Martirosyan attempted and made a 240 kg clean & jerk, setting new world records in the clean & jerk and total, and winning the gold medal.

He competed at the 2019 World Weightlifting Championships in the 109 kg category after a convincing win at the 2019 European Weightlifting Championships. He competed against silver medalist in the previous championships (Yang Zhe) and 2008 Olympic Champion (Andrei Aramnau). During the snatch competition Zhe, Aramnau and Martirosyan had their third snatch attempts in succession completed a world record lift each time. Zhe completed a 197 kg snatch, Aramnau with a 198 kg snatch and finally Martirosyan with a 199 kg lift. During the clean & jerk portion Martirosyan was the last lifter to make an attempt and with his lift of 230 kg he secured the gold medal in the clean & jerk and total.

In 2021, he won the bronze medal in the men's 109kg event at the 2021 World Weightlifting Championships held in Tashkent, Uzbekistan.

European Championships
In 2016 he competed at the 2016 European Weightlifting Championships and won a bronze medal in 105 kg category. The following year he competed at the 2017 European Weightlifting Championships in Split, Croatia in the 105 kg category. He won gold medals in the snatch, clean & jerk and total, outlifting silver medalist Vasil Gospodinov by 17 kg. He returned to the European Weightlifting Championships in 2019 and swept gold medals and finished with a total of 427 kg, 16 kg over Andrei Aramnau.

Major results

References

External links

1997 births
Living people
Armenian male weightlifters
Weightlifters at the 2014 Summer Youth Olympics
Weightlifters at the 2016 Summer Olympics
People from Armavir Province
Olympic weightlifters of Armenia
Medalists at the 2016 Summer Olympics
Medalists at the 2020 Summer Olympics
Olympic silver medalists for Armenia
Olympic medalists in weightlifting
Universiade medalists in weightlifting
World Weightlifting Championships medalists
Universiade gold medalists for Armenia
Youth Olympic gold medalists for Armenia
European Weightlifting Championships medalists
Ethnic Armenian sportspeople
Weightlifters at the 2020 Summer Olympics
21st-century Armenian people